Irlbachia is a genus of flowering plants belonging to the family Gentianaceae.

It is native to Colombia, Venezuela, Guyana and Brazil.

The genus name of Irlbachia is in honour of Franz Gabriel von Bray (1765–1832), a Bavarian diplomat and naturalist. He was president of the botanical society in Regensburg. It was first described and published in Nov. Gen. Sp. Pl. Vol.2 on page 101 in 1827.

Species 
According to Kew:
Irlbachia nemorosa 
Irlbachia phelpsiana 
Irlbachia plantaginifolia 
Irlbachia poeppigii 
Irlbachia tatei

References

Gentianaceae
Gentianaceae genera
Plants described in 1827
Flora of Guyana
Flora of Colombia
Flora of Venezuela
Flora of Brazil